In enzymology, a 3-hydroxypropionate dehydrogenase is an enzyme that catalyzes the chemical reaction

3-hydroxypropanoate + NAD+  3-oxopropanoate + NADH + H+

Thus, the two substrates of this enzyme are 3-hydroxypropanoate and NAD+, whereas its 3 products are 3-oxopropanoate, NADH, and H+.

This enzyme belongs to the family of oxidoreductases, specifically those acting on the CH-OH group of donor with NAD+ or NADP+ as acceptor. The systematic name of this enzyme class is 3-hydroxypropanoate:NAD+ oxidoreductase. This enzyme participates in beta-alanine metabolism and propanoate metabolism.

References

 

EC 1.1.1
NADH-dependent enzymes
Enzymes of unknown structure